"I Will Always Love You" is a song performed by American contemporary R&B group Troop, issued as the fifth and final single from the group's second studio album Attitude. Co-written by co-lead singer Steve Russell, the song peaked at #31 on the Billboard R&B chart in 1991.

Chart positions

References

External links
 
 

1989 songs
1990 singles
Atlantic Records singles
Song recordings produced by Dallas Austin
Song recordings produced by Joyce Irby
Songs written by Dallas Austin
Songs written by Joyce Irby
Troop (band) songs